The Grumman F3F was a biplane fighter aircraft produced by the Grumman aircraft for the United States Navy during the mid-1930s.  Designed as an improvement on the F2F, it entered service in 1936 as the last biplane to be delivered to any American military air arm. It was retired from front line squadrons at the end of 1941 before it could serve in World War II, and replaced by the Brewster F2A Buffalo. The F3F, which inherited the Leroy Grumman-designed retractable main landing gear configuration first used on the Grumman FF, served as the basis for a biplane design ultimately developed into the much more successful F4F Wildcat that succeeded the subpar Buffalo.

Design and development

The Navy's experience with the F2F revealed issues with stability and unfavorable spin characteristics, prompting the 15 October 1934 contract for the improved XF3F-1, placed before F2F deliveries began. The contract also required a capability for ground attack, in addition to the design's fighter role. Powered by the same Pratt & Whitney R-1535-72 Twin Wasp Junior engine as the F2F, the fuselage was lengthened and wing area increased over the earlier design. A reduction in wheel diameter allowed greater fuselage streamlining, eliminating the prominent bulge behind the cowling of the F2F.

The prototype, BuNo. 9727, was delivered and first flown on 20 March 1935 with company test pilot Jimmy Collins making three flights that day. Two days later, six dive-recovery flights took place; on the 10th dive, the aircraft's pullout at 8,000 ft (2,438 m) registered 14 g on the test equipment. The aircraft broke up in midair, crashing in a cemetery and killing Collins. A second, strengthened prototype was built, but it crashed on 9 May of the same year following the pilot's bailout during an unsuccessful spin recovery. The second prototype was rebuilt in three weeks, flying on 20 June 1935. An order for 54 F3F-1fighters was placed on 24 August of that year, following the conclusion of the flight test program.

Operational history

Marine squadron VF-4M received the last six in January 1937.

Grumman, wanting to take advantage of the powerful new 950 hp (708 kW) Wright R-1820 supercharged radial engine, began work on the F3F-2 without a contract; the order for 81 aircraft was not placed until 25 July 1936, two days before the type's first flight. The engine's larger diameter changed the cowling's appearance, making the aircraft look even more like a barrel, though top speed increased to 255 mph (410 km/h) at 12,000 ft (3,658 m).

The entire F3F-2 production series was delivered in between 1937 and 1938; when deliveries ended, all seven Navy and Marine Corps pursuit squadrons were equipped with Grumman single-seat fighters. Further aerodynamic improvements were made to an F3F-2 (BuNo 1031) based on wind tunnel studies in the NACA Langley 30' x 60' full-scale wind tunnel and became the  XF3F-3. It featured a larger-diameter propeller, and a complete revision of the fuselage skinning forward of the aft cabane strut in order to improve aerodynamics and reduce carbon monoxide intrusion. On 21 June 1938, the Navy ordered 27 F3F-3s, as new monoplane fighters like the Brewster F2A and Grumman's own F4F Wildcat were taking longer to develop than had been planned.

With the introduction of the Brewster F2A-1, the Navy's biplane fighter days were numbered. All F3Fs were withdrawn from squadron service by the end of 1941, though 117 were assigned to naval bases (Mainly NAS Miami and NAS Corpus Christi) and used for training and utility duties until December 1943.

The G-32 and G-32A two-place aircraft were used by the U.S. Army Air Force as ferry-pilot trainers, under the designation UC-103/UC-103A.

A civilian aerobatic two-seat variant, the G-22A "Gulfhawk II," was constructed in 1936 and flown by Major Alfred "Al" Williams, head of Gulf Oil's aviation department.

Variants
Data from: Aerofiles - Grumman 
G-11
Company designation for F3F-1 carrier-borne fighters
XF3F-1
Three prototypes of the F3F (all with the same Bureau Number, 9727), powered by single  Pratt & Whitney R-1535-84 Twin Wasp Juniors
F3F-1
Initial production version for the US Navy, 54 built. BuNos 0211 through 0264.
G-19
Company designation for the F3F-2 and F3F-3
XF3F-2
A single prototype (BuNo 0452), powered by a single  Wright XR-1820-22 Cyclone G
F3F-2
Second production model for the US Navy, powered by a single  Wright R-1820-22 Cyclone, 81 built. BuNos 0967 through 1047.
XF3F-3
A single prototype (BuNo 1031) of the F3F-3 with curved windshield, a modified forward fuselage with a widened diameter and cowling with a single cowl flap on either side
F3F-3
Final production variant for the US Navy, 27 built. Featured a redesigned forward fuselage forward of the aft cabane struts. BuNos 1444 through 1470.
G-22 Gulfhawk II

A single hybrid F2F/F3F, powered by a  Wright R-1820 Cyclone, for display pilot Al Williams, sponsored by the Gulf Oil Company for demonstration flights and aerobatic displays. The G-22 Gulfhawk II was retired to the National Air Museum in October 1948.
G-32 Gulfhawk III / G-32A
A two-seat civilian variant of the F3F series, powered by a  Wright R-1820 Cyclone. Two aircraft were built, one (G-32, NC1051) for noted Gulf Oil pilot Alford Williams as the "Gulfhawk III", and the second (G-32A, NC1326) retained by Grumman as a fast executive transport-chase aircraft. Both of these aircraft incorporated landing flaps into the lower surface of the upper wing, the only variant of the series to be so fitted.
UC-103
Both G-32 aircraft were impressed into the USAAF in 1942; Williams's G-32 Gulfhawk III was destroyed in a crash in Florida and the G-32A survived until 1971 when it crashed after being abandoned due to an inflight fire

Operators

 
 United States Army Air Forces
 United States Marine Corps
VF-4M
VMF-1
VMF-2
VMF-211
VMJ-1
 United States Navy
VF-2B
VF-3B
VF-5B
VF-6B
VF-2
VF-3
VF-4
VF-5
VF-6
VF-71
VF-72

Surviving aircraft

Today, there are four flying aircraft, three F3F-2 models and the Grumman demonstrator G-32A, all which were restored by Herb Tischler's Texas Airplane Factory in Fort Worth. The restorations took four years and consisted of rebuilding the G-32A from original blueprints with tooling built at the Texas Airplane Factory. The wreckage of three -2 aircraft which had originally crashed in Hawaii were utilized to complete the other restorations.

 0972 – F3F-2 owned by Hawks Zeroq3 in Sonoma, California. This airframe was restored by Chris Prevost and has been on the flight line at Vintage Aircraft in Sonoma, California. It has since been sold to Lewis Air Legends in Texas.
 0976 – F3F-2 on static display at the National Naval Aviation Museum in Pensacola, Florida. This aircraft was ditched off the coast of San Diego on 29 August 1940 while attempting a landing on Saratoga. The fighter was rediscovered by a U.S. Navy submarine in June 1988, and recovered on 5 April 1991. It was restored at the San Diego Aerospace Museum before going on display at the National Naval Aviation Museum.
 1028 – F3F-2 on display at the Fantasy of Flight in Polk City, Florida.
 1033 – F3F-2 owned by the Greatest Generation Naval Museum in Carlsbad, California.
 335 – G-22 on static display at the Steven F. Udvar-Hazy Center of the National Air and Space Museum in Chantilly, Virginia.
 Replica – G-32A owned by Comanche Warbirds Inc in Houston, Texas. This airframe is a replica rebuilt at the Texas Airplane Factory using the identity of G-32A construction number 447, which crashed in 1971.

Specifications (F3F-2)

Popular culture
The F3F was featured as the XFAA-1 "experimental fighter" in Warner Bros.'s Wings of the Navy (1939). The F3F-2 was featured in the 1940 film Flight Command, starring Robert Taylor as a pilot whose work developing instrument landing systems helps his lost squadron return to NAS North Island.

Perhaps the most prominent and popular record of F3Fs is in the 1941 Technicolor film Dive Bomber, also set at NAS North Island. This film extensively used parked F3Fs as background, and one single F3F-2 from Fighting Squadron SIX, (BuNo 0989, 6-F-4) in flight in the last action scene.

See also

References

Notes

Bibliography

 Cacutt, Len. Grumman Single-Seat Biplane Fighters. London: Marshall Cavendish, 1989. . 
 Crosby, Francis. Fighter Aircraft. London: Lorenz Books, 2002. .
 Dann, Richard S. (USN, LCDR). Grumman Biplane Fighters in action. Aircraft In Action 150. Carrollton, Texas: Squadron/Signal Publications, 1996. .
 Orriss, Bruce. When Hollywood Ruled the Skies: The Aviation Film Classics of World War II. Hawthorne, California: Aero Associates Inc., 1984. .

External links

 The Grumman F3F: The U.S. Navy's Last Biplane Fighter
 Fantasy of Flight's F3F

F03F
1930s United States fighter aircraft
Single-engined tractor aircraft
Biplanes
Carrier-based aircraft
Aircraft first flown in 1935